Harold Glenn Hamm (born December 11, 1945) is an American entrepreneur in the oil and gas business. He is known for extracting shale oil resources. , Hamm's net worth is estimated to be billion, making him the 63rd wealthiest person in the world. He is the founder and chairman of Continental Resources. In 2012, presidential candidate Mitt Romney named Hamm as his energy advisor, and Hamm donated to and advised Romney's election effort.

Early life
Hamm was born in Lexington, Oklahoma, the 13th and youngest child of cotton sharecroppers, Jane Elizabeth (née Sparks) and Leland Albert Hamm.

Career
In 1967, he founded Shelly Dean Oil Company, which would later become Continental Resources. The company pioneered the development of the Bakken oil field in North Dakota and Montana using horizontally drilled wells and hydraulic fracturing. When Continental Resources grew into a major oil producer, Hamm became a billionaire. Continental Resources, known for its use of shale oil, is Oklahoma's fourth-largest public company.

Political involvement
Shortly after being named energy advisor to Republican Mitt Romney's presidential campaign in March 2012, Hamm donated $985,000 to the pro-Romney super PAC Restore Our Future. Hamm has been described as part of the conservative donor network of the Koch brothers, Charles and David Koch.

In January 2016, Hamm claimed that Saudi Arabia was unsuccessfully attempting to "flood the crude market at a time of oversupply".

At the 2016 Republican National Convention, Hamm criticized the Obama administration's energy policies, claiming that President Barack Obama was "burdening oil companies with greater regulations" so that gasoline prices would spike. Hamm also denounced the Iran nuclear deal struck by the Department of State in 2015, asserting that Iran would be more able to export petroleum and develop an atomic bomb.

In the 2016 United States presidential election, Republican candidate Donald Trump considered appointing Hamm as energy secretary.

Involvement in education

Hamm has honorary degrees from Northwestern Oklahoma State University and the University of Oklahoma.

The Harold Hamm Diabetes Center at the University of Oklahoma was named after Hamm, who has type 2 diabetes. To create the center, the Harold and Sue Ann Hamm Foundation donated $10 million. Hamm is a member of the Global Leadership Council at the Offutt School of Business of Concordia College, Moorhead.

On February 1, 2022, the Harold Hamm Foundation and Continental Resources announced a $12 million gift to the University of Mary in Bismarck, North Dakota, to establish the Hamm School of Engineering and endow a "Continental Resources | Monsignor James Shea Chair of Engineering" at the private, Catholic university. It is believed to be the largest philanthropic single gift given to education in the region of western North Dakota and eastern Montana, the footprint of the Bakken formation.

Awards and recognition

In 2007, Hamm was named the Ernst & Young "Entrepreneur of the Year", and in 2009, he was named "Energy Advocate of the Year" by the International Energy Policy Conference.

Hamm was inducted into the Oklahoma Hall of Fame in 2011.

In 2012, Time magazine named Hamm one of the "World's 100 Most Influential People".

Hamm was named "CEO of the Year" by Platts Global Energy Awards in 2013, the same year they named Continental "Energy Company of the Year.

Forbes featured him on its cover in May 2014, publishing the story "Harold Hamm: The Billionaire Oilman Fueling America's Recovery".

He was named "Wildcatter of the Year" by Western Energy Alliance in 2015.

In 2016, he received the Horatio Alger Award. He also received in 2016 the "Executive of the Year" award from Oil and Gas Investor magazine, as well as a "Lifetime Achievement Award", again from Platts Global Energy.

Personal life

Hamm's first wife was Judith Ann; they had three children. They divorced in 1987.

In April 1988, Hamm married Sue Ann Arnall, with whom he had two children. Sue Ann is an economist and lawyer, and has been an executive at Continental Resources. She filed for divorce on May 19, 2012, but Hamm said that he separated from her in 2005. Several media outlets reported that up to half of Hamm's estimated $20 billion fortune could be transferred to his wife, which would become a world record for most money transferred in a divorce. While a judge ruled that his ex-wife would receive $1 billion, she rejected the settlement, seeking a greater sum.

Hamm lives in Oklahoma City, Oklahoma, and owns homes in Enid and Nichols Hills, both in Oklahoma.

References

1945 births
American billionaires
21st-century philanthropists
Living people
Oklahoma Republicans
People from Lexington, Oklahoma
Businesspeople from Oklahoma City
Businesspeople from Enid, Oklahoma